Pyrrhospora is a genus of lichen-forming fungi in the family Lecanoraceae. The genus was circumscribed by German lichenologist Gustav Wilhelm Körber in 1855, with Pyrrhospora quernea assigned as the type species.

Species
Pyrrhospora bhutanensis 
Pyrrhospora chlororphnia 
Pyrrhospora endaurantia 
Pyrrhospora fuscisidiata 
Pyrrhospora luminescens 
Pyrrhospora palmicola  – Seychelles
Pyrrhospora quernea 
Pyrrhospora rubiginans 

Several species that were once classified in Pyrrhospora have since been transferred to the genus Ramboldia. These include:

Pyrrhospora amagiensis  (now Ramboldia amagiensis)
Pyrrhospora arandensis  (now Ramboldia arandensis)
Pyrrhospora aurantiaca  (now Ramboldia aurantiaca)
Pyrrhospora aurea  (now Ramboldia aurea)
Pyrrhospora bullata  (now Ramboldia bullata)
Pyrrhospora cinnabarina  (now Ramboldia cinnabarina)
Pyrrhospora elabens  (now Ramboldia elabens)
Pyrrhospora gowardiana  (now Ramboldia gowardiana)
Pyrrhospora griseococcinea  (now Ramboldia griseococcinea)
Pyrrhospora laeta  (now Ramboldia laeta)
Pyrrhospora lusitanica  (now Ramboldia lusitanica)
Pyrrhospora manipurensis  (now Ramboldia manipurensis)
Pyrrhospora petraeoides  (now Ramboldia petraeoides)
Pyrrhospora russula  (now Ramboldia russula)
Pyrrhospora sanguinolenta  (now Ramboldia sanguinolenta)
Pyrrhospora subcinnabarina  (now Ramboldia subcinnabarina)

References

Lecanoraceae
Lichen genera
Lecanorales genera
Taxa named by Gustav Wilhelm Körber
Taxa described in 1855